Bradfield St. Clare is a village and civil parish in the West Suffolk district of Suffolk, England. According to Eilert Ekwall, the meaning of the village name is "the wide field". The Domesday Book records the population of Bradfield St. Clare in 1086 to be 76; this includes Bradfield Combust and Bradfield St George.  The village is about six miles south of Bury St Edmunds. The village includes a church.

References

External links

Villages in Suffolk
Borough of St Edmundsbury
Civil parishes in Suffolk
Thedwastre Hundred